= Apollas =

Apollas or Apellas (Ancient Greek: Ἀπολλᾶς or Ancient Greek: Ἀπελλᾶς) was the author of a work On the Cities in the Peloponnese (Περὶ τῶν ἐν Πελοποννήσῳ πόλεων) about the Peloponnese peninsula, and On Delphi (Δελφικά). He appears to be the same as Apeilas, the geographer, of Cyrene mentioned in other manuscripts.
